The Hardy House is a historic house at 2400 Broadway in Little Rock, Arkansas.  It is a two-story brick structure, with flanking single-story wings and a roof that is designed to resemble an English country house's thatched roof.  The entrance is set in a centrally located stone round arch, with a multipart segmented-arch window above.  The house was designed by Charles L. Thompson and built in 1921.

The house was listed on the National Register of Historic Places in 1982.

See also
National Register of Historic Places listings in Little Rock, Arkansas

References

Houses on the National Register of Historic Places in Arkansas
Houses completed in 1921
Houses in Little Rock, Arkansas
National Register of Historic Places in Little Rock, Arkansas